The Amberg–Schmidmühlen railway was a 21 kilometre long Bavarian branch line in southern Germany. It ran through the county of Amberg-Sulzbach from Amberg along the river Vils as far as Schmidmühlen.

Although as early as 1904 the legal basis had been established for this Lokalbahn route that was to link Amberg along the Vils valley with Schmidmühlen, there were considerable delays due to numerous arguments over questions of detail as well as over an extension of the line to Hohenburg in the Lauterach valley. The first section to Ensdorf, which branched off the line to Lauterhofen at Drahthammer station, was not opened until 1 May 1910. The second section followed on 18 December 1910, bringing the total length of the line to 21 kilometres. Passenger trains, however, started from Amberg, so that the journey was about 2 kilometres longer.

As a result of the increased use of railway buses in the 1950s and 1960s, passenger services on the rails were withdrawn on  1 July 1966. Goods traffic continued for considerably longer, albeit only for one customer: the limekiln belonging to the Maxhütte factory at Vilshofen. From time to time heavy goods trains, which needed three DB Class 211 diesel locomotives, ran to the kiln. But on 28 May 1988 that came to an end; the section south of  Vilshofen had already closed on 31 May 1985.

In 1990 the route was purchased by the county (Landkreis) and converted to a cycle path between 1991 and 1992.

Sources 
 Gerald Hoch, Andreas Kuhfahl: Nebenbahnen in der Oberpfalz. 1. Auflage 2000. Resch-Verlag, Neustadt bei Coburg, 2000, .

See also
Bavarian branch lines
Royal Bavarian State Railways
List of railway stations in Bavaria
List of closed railway lines in Bavaria

Amberg-Sulzbach
Branch lines in Bavaria
Railway lines opened in 1910
Railway lines closed in 1988